Balandine is a settlement in Senegal located southeast of Djinoungué, and northwest of Thindieng on the Baila river in west Africa.

References

External links
PEPAM

Populated places in Senegal